Elections to Mole Valley Council were held on 2 May 2002. One third of the council was up for election and the council stayed under no overall control.

After the election, the composition of the council was:
Conservative 18
Liberal Democrat 15
Independent 7
Labour 1

Election result

Ward results

References
2002 Mole Valley election result
 Ward results

2002
2002 English local elections
2000s in Surrey